Sagaing Region (formerly Sagaing Division) is an administrative region of Myanmar, located in the north-western part of the country between latitude 21° 30' north and longitude 94° 97' east. It is bordered by India's Nagaland, Manipur, and Arunachal Pradesh States to the north, Kachin State, Shan State, and Mandalay Region to the east, Mandalay Region and Magway Region to the south, with the Ayeyarwady River forming a greater part of its eastern and also southern boundary, and Chin State and India to the west. In 1996, it had a population of over 5,300,000 while its population in 2012 was 6,600,000. The urban population in 2012 was 1,230,000 and the rural population was 5,360,000. The capital city of Sagaing Region is Monywa.

Capital city 
The Capital city of Sagaing Region is Monywa.

History
The Pyu were the first to in recorded history to populate the area of Sagaing Region by the first century CE. The Burmans first migrated into Upper Myanmar by ninth century CE. The area came under the Pagan Kingdom certainly by the middle of 11th century when King Anawrahta (r. 1044–1077) founded the Pagan Empire, which encompasses the modern day Myanmar.

After the fall of Pagan in 1287, the northwestern parts of Upper Myanmar came under the Sagaing Kingdom (1315–1364) ruled by Burmanized Shan kings. The area was ruled by the kings of Ava from 1364 to 1555 and the kings of Taungoo from 1555 to 1752. Konbaung Dynasty (1752–1885), founded by king Alaungpaya in Shwebo, became the last Burmese dynasty before the British conquest of Upper Burma in 1885. The area became Sagaing Division after the Burmese independence in January 1948.

In the aftermath of the 2021 Myanmar coup d'état, Sagaing Region, which is part of the Bamar homeland, emerged as a stronghold of resistance against military rule. Myanmar Armed Forces have engaged in significant military offensives throughout the region to quell resistance and intimidate local villagers. Sagaing Region has since become the site of several high-profile massacres by military forces, including the 2022 Let Yet Kone massacre and the 2023 Tar Taing massacre.

Administrative divisions
As of 2021, Sagaing Region consists of 11 districts and 1 Self-Administered Zone divided into 34 townships with 198 wards and villages. The major cities are Sagaing, Shwebo, Monywa, Ye U, Katha, Kale, Tamu, Mawlaik and Hkamti. Mingun with its famous bell is located near Sagaing but can be reached across the Ayeyarwady from Mandalay.

In August 2010, three former townships of Hkamti District were transferred, in accordance with the 2008 constitution, to a new administrative unit, the Naga Self-Administered Zone.

Government

Executive

Legislature

Judiciary

Demographics 

The Bamar (Burmans) are the majority ethnic group in the dry regions and along the Mandalay-Myitkyina Railroad. Shan live in the upper Chindwin River valley. A sizable minority of Naga resides in the north of north-west mountain ranges and Kuki which includes the Thadou in the south. Smaller ethnic groups native to the Region include the Kadu and Ganang, who live in the upper Mu River valley and Meza River valley. There are also an unknown number of Catholic Bayingyi people (at least 3,000), the descendants of 16th and 17th century Portuguese adventurers and mercenaries, who live in their ancestral villages on the expansive plains of the Mu River valley.

Religion 

According to the 2014 Myanmar Census, Buddhists, who make up 92.2% of Sagaing Region's population, form the largest religious community there. Minority religious communities include Christians (6.6%), Muslims (1.1%), and Hindus (0.1%) who collectively comprise the remainder of Sagaing Region's population. 0.1% of the population listed no religion, other religions, or were otherwise not enumerated.

According to the State Sangha Maha Nayaka Committee’s 2016 statistics, 55,041 Buddhist monks were registered in Sagaing Region, comprising 10.3% of Myanmar's total Sangha membership, which includes both novice samanera and fully-ordained bhikkhu. The majority of monks belong to the Thudhamma Nikaya (83.8%), followed by Shwegyin Nikaya (16.1%), with the remainder of monks belonging to other small monastic orders. 9,915 thilashin were registered in Sagaing Region, comprising 16.4% of Myanmar's total thilashin community.

Ecology
There are a number of protected areas in Sagaing Region, among them are Alaungdaw Kathapa National Park, Chatthin Wildlife Sanctuary, Mahamyaing Wildlife Sanctuary, and Htamanthi Wildlife Sanctuary in Homalin Township.

Transport

Hemmed in by two great rivers of Myanmar, the Irrawaddy and the Chindwin, river transport is a common way to move people and cargo. Much of the inland Sagaing Region relies on roads and rail in poor condition.

Economy
Agriculture is the chief occupation. The leading crop is rice, which occupies most of the arable ground. Other crops include wheat, sesame, peanut, pulses, cotton, and tobacco. The region being next to India, depends on the export import business from India. It is the gateway to India for Myanmar. Sagaing is Myanmar's leading producer of wheat, contributing more than 80% of the country's total production. Forestry is important in the wetter upper regions along the Chindwin River, with teak and other hardwoods extracted. As in other parts of the country, reforestation is not effective enough to maintain sustainable forestry. Important minerals include gold, coal, salt and small amounts of petroleum. Industry includes textiles, copper refining, gold smelting, and a diesel engine plant. The Region has many rice mills, edible oil mills, saw mills, cotton mills, and mechanized weaving factories. Local industry includes earthen pots, silverware, bronze-wares, iron-wares and lacquerware.

Education

Educational opportunities in Myanmar are extremely limited outside the main cities of Yangon and Mandalay. According to official statistics, less than 10% of primary school students in Sagaing Region reach high school.

Sagaing Region has three national "professional" universities in the Monywa University of Economics, Sagaing University of Education and the Sagaing Institute of Education. Monywa University is the main liberal arts university in the region. Sagaing Institute of Education also known Sagaing University of Education is the one of two senior universities of education in Myanmar.

Healthcare
The general state of healthcare in Myanmar is poor. The military government spends anywhere from 0.5% to 3% of the country's GDP on health care, consistently ranking among the lowest in the world. Although healthcare is nominally free, in reality, patients have to pay for medicine and treatment, even in public clinics and hospitals. Public hospitals lack many of the basic facilities and equipment. Moreover, the healthcare infrastructure outside of Yangon and Mandalay is extremely poor. In 2003, Sagaing Region had less than a quarter of the number of hospital beds counted in Yangon Region, with a similar size of population.

References

External links 

 
Regions of Myanmar